Gamasellus changbaiensis is a species of mite in the family Ologamasidae.

References

changbaiensis
Articles created by Qbugbot
Animals described in 1995